Debb Carpenter (born August 11, 1972) is a Canadian former professional ice hockey player.

Carpenter attended the University of Lethbridge before turning professional to play the 1998–99 season in the British Ice Hockey Superleague with the London Knights, with whom he competed for the BH Cup.

On November 22, 2000, he signed with the San Antonio Iguanas, but played only five games with the Central Hockey League team before returning to the United Kingdom. He retired following the 2000–2001 season after competing for the Challenge Cup with the Ayr Scottish Eagles.

References

External links

1972 births
Living people
Ayr Scottish Eagles players
Basingstoke Bison players
Canadian ice hockey right wingers
Hull Thunder players
Ice hockey people from Edmonton
London Knights (UK) players
San Antonio Iguanas players
University of Lethbridge alumni
Canadian expatriate ice hockey players in England
Canadian expatriate ice hockey players in Scotland
Canadian expatriate ice hockey players in the United States